Angherr Shisspa is the fourth studio album by the Zeuhl band Koenjihyakkei.

Track listing 
All tracks by Yoshida Tatsuya except where noted

 "Tziidall Raszhisst" – 7:14
 "Rattims Friezz" (Sakamoto, Yoshida) – 7:01
 "Grahbem Jorgazz" (Kanazawa, Yoshida) – 4:06
 "Fettim Paillu" – 7:45
 "Quivem Vrastorr" – 4:22
 "Mibingvahre" (Sakamoto) – 4:07
 "Angherr Shisspa" – 6:34
 "Wammilica Iffirom" – 8:39

Personnel 
 Yoshida Tatsuya – drums, vocals
 Sakamoto Kengo – bass, vocals
 Kanazawa Miyako – keyboards, vocals
 Yamamoto Kyoko – vocals
 Komori Keiko – reeds, vocals

References

External links 
 KOENJIHYAKKEI Angherr Shisspa reviews and MP3 @ progarchives.com

2005 albums
Kōenji Hyakkei albums